Chaetostoma microps is a species of suckermouth armored catfish native to Ecuador. The fish has been filmed climbing cave walls.

Discovery
The species was first described by Albert Günther in 1864. The type specimen is from the "Andes of western Ecuador".

Description

C. microps has the following characteristics :
 absence of plates (external flattened armoured structures) on the ventral region
 absence of plates on the edge of the catfish snout
 presence of interopercular odontodes (barbs behind the gill covers), a characteristic shared with another species - C. platyrhynchus
 absence of fleshy tentacles on the snout, differentiating this genus from Ancistrus spp.

C. microps has a few sexually dimorphic characteristics, namely the head of females is smaller and narrower than that of males, while broader ventrally; in addition, the pelvic fins of the male are much larger, evidently so that, when inverted over a cluster of fish-eggs, they can protect sperm from being carried away in the current and thus aid fertilisation.

Natural history

C. microps, which has previously been recorded in rivers originating from the Andes mountains, clings to rocks. The fish are primarily algae-feeders.

Recently, the fish was recorded underground from limestone caves containing streams, near Tena, Napo Province, Ecuador.

Climbing fish are known in epigean astroblepids and loricariids. A fish that climbs waterfalls and rapids, Cryptotora thamicola, has been recorded from Thailand.

C. microps is unique in that this fish can "shimmy up cave walls where water streamed down from tiny underground tributaries". The fish is able to crawl up walls, having an angle of up to 75°, where a thin film of flowing water occurs, with the help of morphological modifications to the mouth, fins and skin. It has been surmised that this species has begun evolving for a life underground.

References

microps
Fish of Ecuador
Fish described in 1864
Taxa named by Albert Günther